Dhirendra Nath Bezboruah is an Indian journalist, writer and the founder editor of The Sentinel, a Guwahati-based English language daily. Born in 1933 in the Jorhat district of the northeast Indian state of Assam, he started his career as a lecturer, after completing his post graduate studies at Reading University, UK. When The Sentinel daily was established in 1983, he was selected as the founder editor, a post he held for a number of years. He was associated with the Media Trust, Assam and was the working president of its celebration committee in 1992. The many books he has published from Assamese into English includes The Cavern and Other Stories, a short story anthology written by Bhabendra Nath Saikia. He received the B. D. Goenka Award for Journalism in 1997 and the Nachiketa Samman of Panchjanya weekly in 2001. He is also recipient of Katha Award for translation. The Government of India awarded him the fourth highest civilian honour of the Padma Shri, in 2016, for his contributions to literature.

See also 
 The Sentinel
 Bhabendra Nath Saikia

References

External links 
 
 

Recipients of the Padma Shri in literature & education
1933 births
20th-century Indian journalists
20th-century Indian translators
Journalists from Assam
Living people
Assamese-language writers
English-language writers from India